Indian Mills is an unincorporated community in Summers County, West Virginia, United States.  It lies to the southeast of the city of Hinton, the county seat of Summers County.   Its elevation is 1,545 feet (471 m).

References

Unincorporated communities in Summers County, West Virginia
Unincorporated communities in West Virginia